John Butler ( – May 12, 1796) was an American-born military officer, landowner, merchant and colonial official in the British Indian Department. During the American Revolutionary War, he was a prominent Loyalist who led the provincial regiment known as Butler's Rangers on the frontiers of New York and Pennsylvania. Born in Connecticut, he moved to New York with his family, where he learned several Iroquoian languages and worked as an interpreter in the fur trade. He was well-equipped to work with Mohawk and other Iroquois warriors who became allies of the British during the rebellion.

During the Revolutionary War, persuaded the Seneca to participate in the St. Leger's Expedition in New York. Afterwards he was given permission to raise a "corps of rangers" to work closely with Britain's native allies. Butler's Rangers participated in raids in New York and Pennsylvania, including the Cherry Valley Massacre and the Battle of Wyoming, also known as the Wyoming Massacre. After the war Butler resettled in Upper Canada, where he was given a grant of land by the Crown for his services. Butler continued his leadership in the developing colony, serving in public office, and helping to establish the Anglican Church and the Masonic Order in what is now Ontario.

Early life
John Butler was born to Walter Butler and Deborah Dennison, née Ely, in New London, Connecticut in 1728. In 1742, his father moved the family to Fort Hunter on the frontier in the Mohawk Valley near the modern village of Fonda, New York.  In 1752, John Butler married Catharine (Catalyntje) Bradt, of Dutch ancestry. The couple raised five children (two others died in infancy).  Having learned several Iroquois and other Indigenous languages, Butler was employed as an interpreter, especially in the lucrative fur trade.

French and Indian War
In 1755, John Butler was appointed to the rank of captain in the British Indian Department. He served in the French and Indian War under Sir William Johnson.  In 1758, he saw action with James Abercromby at Fort Ticonderoga and John Bradstreet at the Battle of Fort Frontenac. In 1759, he was made second in command of the Indians with Johnson at the Battle of Fort Niagara, where he played a crucial role in flanking the French reinforcements. In 1760, he continued as a second in command of the Indians in Jeffery Amherst's force at Montreal.

Pre-American Revolution years
After the war Butler returned to the Mohawk Valley in New York. He was second only to Sir William Johnson, British Superintendent of Indian Affairs, as a wealthy frontier land owner, and worked under Johnson for the British Indian Department. In 1772, Butler was appointed a judge in the Tryon County court and was commissioned Lieutenant Colonel of Guy Johnson's regiment of Tryon County militia. Butler was elected as one of the two members representing Tryon County in the New York assembly.

American Revolutionary War

John Butler returned to service, as a Loyalist, when the American Revolution turned to war in 1775. In May 1775, he left for Canada in the company of Daniel Claus, Walter Butler, Hon Yost Schuyler and Joseph Brant, a Mohawk leader. On July 7, they reached Fort Oswego and in August, Montreal. Butler participated in the defence of Montreal against an attack led by Ethan Allen. In November, Guy Carleton, Governor of the Province of Quebec, sent him to Fort Niagara with instructions to keep the Indians neutral. His oldest son, Walter Butler served with him, but his wife and other children were detained by the American rebels.

In March 1776, John Butler sent a party of about 100 allied Indians to Montreal to force the Americans out of Quebec. In May 1777, Butler received instructions to use a warrior party of the Six Nations in an attack on New York. On June 5 he received instructions to send as many Indians as he could to Fort Oswego for an attack on Fort Stanwix as a part of the Saratoga Campaign. Butler persuaded about 350 Seneca warriors to participate, and was appointed second in command of the Indians under Daniel Claus.

Butler successfully coordinated the ambush of rebel militia and Oneida warriors at the Battle of Oriskany. As a result he was commissioned a Major and given authority to raise his own regiment, which became known as Butler's Rangers, initially with a strength of eight companies.  He travelled back to Fort Niagara, and completed recruiting the first company in December.

In July 1778, Butler led his rangers and Iroquois allies at the Battle of Wyoming, in which he defeated Lieutenant Colonel Zebulon Butler's militia and Continentals and captured Forty Fort. Later, the battle was referred to as the "Wyoming Massacre" because of the many Patriots who were killed and scalped as they fled the battlefield. In the days following the battle, homes, barns and mills in the area were looted and burned, however, the inhabitants were not harmed.

Butler commanded his Rangers from his headquarters at Fort Niagara. In 1779, he was defeated at the Battle of Newtown, the only major engagement of the Sullivan Expedition against the Iroquois. He was promoted from Major to Lieutenant Colonel in the winter of 1780.

In 1780, Butler commanded the four companies of Rangers that participated in the large-scale raid on the Schoharie and Mohawk Valleys. The raid culminated in the inconclusive Battle of Klock's Field on October 19, 1780. Later in the war, John Butler's rangers were spread, through frontier outposts, from Niagara to Illinois County, Virginia.

Post-war years and death

At the end of the Revolution, John Butler was given a land grant in the Niagara region by the Crown for his services during the war and as compensation for his property in New York having been confiscated. He developed it for agriculture. He became one of the political leaders of Upper Canada, later called Ontario. He was appointed as a Deputy Superintendent for the Indian Department, a Justice of the Peace, and the local militia commander. He was also prominent in establishing the Anglican Church and Masonic Order in what is now Ontario. Butler worked with his superior in the Indian Department, Sir John Johnson, 2nd Baronet, in the Johnson-Butler Purchase of 1787–1788 in acquiring lands east of the Toronto Purchase of 1787.

Butler died, at his home, at age 68 in Niagara, Upper Canada, British Canada, now Niagara-on-the-Lake, Ontario, on May 12, 1796. His wife had died three years before. Butler was survived by their three sons and daughter. John Butler is interred in the family burial ground in Niagara-on-the-Lake, Ontario.

Legacy

Col. John Butler School in Niagara-On-The-Lake was named after him, as are numerous other public and private establishments, including a Best Western Hotel, a sports bar, a street leading to the family burial ground on land that was his former property, and the Butler's Barracks established after the War of 1812. The latter has been designated as a National Historic Site.
In 2006, a life-sized bronze bust of Butler was installed at the Valiants Memorial in Ottawa. Alongside Mohawk leader Joseph Brant, he is considered a key player in the founding of British North America and late eighteenth-century Canada.
In 2010, a bust was installed on top of a memorial cairn at the site of his homestead on Balmoral Drive in Niagara-on-the-Lake, Ontario.

References

Further reading
 American novelist Joseph Altsheler referred to John Butler as "Indian Butler" in his 1911 novel about the Wyoming Massacre, The Scouts of the Valley, a Story of Wyoming and the Chemung. He referred to Butler as a  turncoat and villain, who sided with the Iroquois against the white settlers. It is available online at the Gutenberg Project.The Scouts of the Valley, a story of Wyoming and the Chemung.
 Olshan, Judd David, "Butlers of the Mohawk Valley: Family Traditions and the Establishment of British Empire in Colonial New York" (2015). Dissertations - ALL. 399. https://surface.syr.edu/etd/399

External links
 The Butler papers Brock University Library Digital Repository

1728 births
1796 deaths
British Indian Department
Politicians from New London, Connecticut
American pioneers
Canadian Anglicans
Colonial American Indian agents
Loyalist military personnel of the American Revolutionary War
American emigrants to Canada
People of the Province of New York
People of New York (state) in the American Revolution
People of colonial Connecticut
American slave owners